This is a list of museums in the province of Almería. According to the Ministry of Culture, there are 8 museums in the province of Almería.

Museums in the province of Almería

See also 
 List of museums in Andalusia
 List of museums in Spain
 Province of Almería

References

External links 
 2010 Official guide of museums in Andalusia 

Province of Almería
.Almería
Almeria